Hard Times is a 1988 Portuguese film adaption of the 1854 novel by Charles Dickens, directed by João Botelho. However, the story is set in modern times.  The film was selected as the Portuguese entry for the Best Foreign Language Film at the 61st Academy Awards, but was not accepted as a nominee.

Cast
 Henrique Viana as José Grandela
 Júlia Britton as Luisa Cremalheira
 Eunice Muñoz as Mrs. Vilaverde
 Ruy Furtado as Tomaz Cremalheira
 Isabel de Castro as Teresa Cremalheira
 Joaquim Mendes as Sebastião
 Isabel Ruth as Sebastião's Wife

See also
 List of submissions to the 61st Academy Awards for Best Foreign Language Film
 List of Portuguese submissions for the Academy Award for Best Foreign Language Film

References

External links

1988 films
1988 drama films
Portuguese drama films
1980s Portuguese-language films
Works about the Industrial Revolution
Films directed by João Botelho
Films based on works by Charles Dickens